Buena Vista Social Club is the debut album by the Buena Vista Social Club, an ensemble of Cuban musicians directed by Juan de Marcos González and American guitarist Ry Cooder. It was recorded at Havana's EGREM studios in March 1996 and released on September 16, 1997, on World Circuit. It is the only standard studio album exclusively credited to the Buena Vista Social Club.

Buena Vista Social Club was recorded in parallel with A toda Cuba le gusta by the Afro-Cuban All Stars, a similar project also promoted by World Circuit executive Nick Gold and featuring largely the same lineup. In contrast to A toda Cuba le gusta, which was conceived as a revival of the son conjunto, Buena Vista Social Club was meant to bring back the traditional trova and filin, a mellower take on the Cuban son and bolero, as well as the danzón.

A critical and commercial success, the album's release was followed by a short concert tour in Amsterdam and New York's Carnegie Hall in 1998. Footage from these dates, as well as from the recording sessions in Havana, is shown in the 1999 documentary Buena Vista Social Club directed by Wim Wenders.

In 2022, the album was selected for preservation in the United States National Recording Registry by the Library of Congress as being "culturally historically or aesthetically significant".

Background
In 1996, American guitarist Ry Cooder had been invited to Havana by British world music producer Nick Gold of World Circuit Records to record a session where two African highlife musicians from Mali were to collaborate with Cuban musicians.  On Cooder's arrival (via Mexico to avoid the ongoing U.S. trade and travel embargo against Cuba), it transpired that the musicians from Africa had not received their visas and were unable to travel to Havana. Cooder and Gold changed their plans and decided to record an album of Cuban son music with local musicians. Already involved in the African collaboration project were Cuban musicians including bassist Orlando "Cachaito" López, guitarist Eliades Ochoa and musical director Juan de Marcos González, who had himself been organizing a similar project for the Afro-Cuban All Stars. A search for additional musicians led the team to singer Manuel "Puntillita" Licea, pianist Rubén González and octogenarian singer Compay Segundo, who all agreed to record for the project.

Within three days of the project's birth, Cooder, Gold and de Marcos had organized a large group of performers and arranged for recording sessions to commence at Havana's EGREM Studios, formerly owned by RCA records, where the equipment and atmosphere had remained unchanged since the 1950s. Communication between the Spanish and English speakers at the studio was conducted via an interpreter, although Cooder reflected that "musicians understand each other through means other than speaking".

Recording
The album was recorded in just six days and contained fourteen tracks; opening with "Chan Chan" written by Compay Segundo, a four-chord son (Dm, F, Gm, A7) that was to become what Cooder described as "the Buena Vista's calling card"; and ending with a rendition of "La bayamesa", a traditional Cuban patriotic song (not to be confused with the Cuban national anthem of the same name). The sessions also produced material for the subsequent release, Introducing...Rubén González, which showcased the work of the Cuban pianist. Among the songs left off the album was the classic bolero-son "Lágrimas negras", which was deemed too popular for inclusion, and Compay Segundo's "Macusa". Both songs were later released on the compilation Lost and Found.

Songs

The majority of the album comprises standards of the trova and filin repertoire, namely sones, guajiras and boleros typically played by small guitar-led ensembles. A foremost example of the son tradition on the album is "Chan Chan", the group's signature tune and the album opener. Written in the 1980s, it is one of Compay Segundo's most famous songs, and one he had recorded several times, most notably with Eliades Ochoa and his Cuarteto Patria. The same formula is followed in this recording, with Ochoa singing lead and Segundo on second voice as his artistic name indicates. The song's lyrics depict a rural scene with two characters: Juanita and Chan Chan. "Chan Chan" is followed by "De camino a la vereda", another son, written and sung by Ibrahim Ferrer.

Another example of the son cubano is Sergio González Siaba's "El cuarto de Tula", sung by Eliades Ochoa, with Ibrahim Ferrer and Manuel "Puntillita" Licea joining Ochoa in an extended descarga (jam) section improvising lyrics. Barbarito Torres plays a frenetic laúd solo towards the end of the track. Timbales are played by the 13-year-old Yulién Oviedo Sánchez. The song is featured in the 2001 film Training Day. "Candela" is another classic son, composed by Faustino Oramas "El Guayabero". Its lyrics, rich with sexual innuendo, are sung by Ibrahim Ferrer who improvises vocal lines throughout the track, while the whole ensemble performs an extended descarga.

Of the many boleros featured in the album, Isolina Carrillo's "Dos gardenias" is perhaps the most famous, being sung here by Ibrahim Ferrer. Carrillo wrote the song in 1945 and it quickly became a huge success in Cuba and abroad. The song was chosen for the album after Cooder heard Ferrer and Rubén González improvising the melody before a recording session. Ferrer learned the song while playing with Cuban bandleader Beny Moré. Another bolero, "¿Y tú qué has hecho?" was written by Eusebio Delfín in the 1920s and features Compay Segundo on tres and vocals. Segundo was traditionally a "second voice" singer providing a baritone counterpoint harmony. On this recording, he multitracks both voices. The song also features a duet between Segundo on tres and Ry Cooder on guitar. "Veinte años", also a bolero, is sung by the only female vocalist in the ensemble, Omara Portuondo, with Segundo on second vocals. It was recorded in one take after Omara had finished her own recording sessions at EGREM studios and was getting ready for a flight to Vietnam. Other boleros included are Rafael Ortiz's "Amor de loca juventud", Eliseo Silveira's "Orgullecida" (both sung by Compay Segundo) and Electo Rosell's "Murmullo" (sung by Ibrahim Ferrer, who used to be the lead vocalist in Rosell's ensemble Orquesta Chepín-Chovén).

"El carretero" is a guajira (country lament) sung by Eliades Ochoa with the full ensemble providing additional instruments and backing vocals, while "La bayamesa", a famous criolla by Sindo Garay, is used as the album closer, with Puntillita, Compay Segundo and Ibrahim Ferrer on vocals.

Two tracks are included from the Cuban danzón repertoire: "Pueblo Nuevo" and "Buena Vista Social Club", both dedicated to locations in Havana, originally recorded by Arcaño y sus Maravillas, and composed by bass player Cachao (although the latter has been wrongly attributed to his brother Orestes López in the liner notes and by Cooder). The title track spotlights the piano work of Rubén González. It was recorded after Cooder heard González improvising around the tune's musical theme before a day's recording session. After playing the tune, González explained to Cooder the history of the social club and that the song was the club's "mascot tune". When searching for a name for the overall project, manager Nick Gold chose the song's title. According to Cooder,It should be the thing that sets it apart. It was a kind of club by then. Everybody was hanging out and we had rum and coffee around two in the afternoon. It felt like a club, so let's call it that. That's what gave it a handle.

Reception

Buena Vista Social Club earned considerable critical praise and has received numerous accolades from music writers and publications. In 2003, the album was ranked number 260 on Rolling Stone magazine's list of the 500 greatest albums of all time, one of only two albums on the list to be produced in a non-English speaking country. The album was also included in the book 1001 Albums You Must Hear Before You Die. As of 2020, the album has sold over 8 million copies.

The album was awarded the 1998 Grammy Award for Best Traditional Tropical Latin Album and Tropical/Salsa Album of the Year by a Group at the 1998 Billboard Latin Music Awards.

In 2022, the album was selected by the Library of Congress for preservation in the National Recording Registry.

Track listing

Chart performance
Buena Vista Social Club achieved considerable sales in Europe, reaching the Top 10 in several countries, including Germany where it topped the charts, as well as the US, where it reached number 80 on the Billboard 200. In 2009, it was awarded a double platinum certification from the Independent Music Companies Association which indicated sales of at least 1,000,000 copies throughout Europe. , it is the second bestselling Latin album in the United States after Dreaming of You (1995) by Selena.

Weekly charts

Year-end charts

Sales and certifications

See also

1997 in Latin music
List of number-one Billboard Top Latin Albums from the 1990s
List of number-one Billboard Tropical Albums from the 1990s
 List of best-selling Latin albums
List of best-selling Latin albums in the United States

References

External links
 Official Buena Vista Social Club website
 Article about Buena Vista Social Club in Salon

1997 debut albums
Buena Vista Social Club albums
Nonesuch Records albums
World Circuit (record label) albums
Spanish-language albums
Albums produced by Ry Cooder
Grammy Award for Best Tropical Latin Album
Descarga albums
United States National Recording Registry recordings
United States National Recording Registry albums